Mark Lygo is a Lord Mayor of Oxford, England from November 2020. Since 2008 he has been a councillor of the Oxford City Council representing the Churchill, Marston and Northway wards for the Labour Party. At the council he has been an executive board member for Sport, Play, Schools Liaison & Olympics. Other his activities include local school governor, supporter of local charities, etc. He is also chairman of the amateur youth football club Quarry Rovers.

See also
List of mayors of Oxford

References

External links 
New Lord Mayor of Oxford to be appointed virtually – BBC News
Oxford history: List of Lord Mayors from 1962

Lord Mayors of Oxford
Members of Oxford City Council
Labour Party (UK) councillors
Labour Party (UK) mayors
Living people
Year of birth missing (living people)